Deerbrook Mall is a mall located in the northern Houston suburb of Humble. It is at the major intersection of I-69/US 59 and FM 1960, near George Bush Intercontinental Airport. Deerbrook Mall is classified as a super-regional mall and is the only mall (for now) in suburban Northeast Houston. The mall is in the middle of Humble's entertainment complex which includes restaurants, other shopping outlets, movie theaters, as well as communities, which creates heavy traffic and congestion during traffic rush hour and weekend rushes. Deerbrook is owned by Brookfield Properties of Chicago, Illinois. The anchor stores are Dick's Sporting Goods, AMC Theatres, JCPenney, Barnes & Noble, Dillard's, Forever 21, and Macy's. There are 2 vacant anchor store that were once Palais Royal and Sears.

History 
The mall quickly became successful, attracting affluent shoppers from areas situated on Lake Houston including Kingwood and Atascocita, along with shoppers from the Spring, Sheldon, Crosby and Porter areas, and its trade area even extended to the Aldine, Greenspoint and North Forest areas of Houston. During the 1990s, the mall underwent a number of changes, including Macy's sale of all but one Houston store to Dillard's, the addition of JCPenney to one of its empty anchor pads, and a 24-screen AMC Theatres complex connected to the mall's "Silver Screen" food court in the central portion of the mall.

In 2006, the mall underwent another anchor charge as Foley's converted to Macy's and Circuit City relocated into the space previously occupied by Mervyn's which exited the Houston market. After Circuit City went bankrupt in 2009, the space was occupied by Total Home Furniture and Decor for a brief period before being filled by a large-format Forever 21. Compared to  other Houston malls, Deerbrook appears to attract fewer upscale retailers, many of which are located in the Kingwood Commons shopping center in the nearby master planned community of Kingwood, and could be vulnerable to competition from developments in Kingwood and eastern Montgomery County.

In Fall 2016, Dick's Sporting Goods joined the mall's lineup, constructing a new two-story, 80,000 sq. ft. store across from Forever 21 on the mall's last remaining anchor pad.

On February 8, 2020, it was announced that Sears would be closing as part of a plan to close 39 stores nationwide. The store closed in April 2020.

References

External links 

 

Shopping malls established in 1984
Brookfield Properties
Shopping malls in Greater Houston